is a former Japanese football player and manager.

Playing career
Takaki was born in Nagasaki Prefecture on April 5, 1977. After graduating from high school, he joined Regional Leagues club Blaze Kumamoto in 1996. In 1998, he moved to J1 League club Verdy Kawasaki (later Tokyo Verdy). However he could not play at all in the match. In 1999, he moved to new club Yokohama FC in Japan Football League (JFL). He played many matches as defensive midfielder and the club won the champions for 2 years in a row (1999-2000) and was promoted to J2 League from 2001. In 2002, he moved to Tokyo Verdy again. In 2003, he returned to Yokohama FC and left the club end of 2003 season. After 1 year blank, he joined JFL club FC Horikoshi. In 2006, he moved to Regional Leagues club FC Gifu. In December 2006, he moved to Prefectural Leagues club MIE Rampole. He retired in January 2007.

Coaching career
In 2011, Takaki became a manager for Regional Leagues club FC Suzuka Rampole. He managed the club until 2014.

Club statistics

References

External links

1977 births
Living people
Association football people from Nagasaki Prefecture
Japanese footballers
J1 League players
J2 League players
Japan Football League players
Tokyo Verdy players
Yokohama FC players
Arte Takasaki players
FC Gifu players
Japanese football managers
Suzuka Point Getters managers
Association football midfielders